Evert Gustav Waldemar Becker, also known as Becker-Bei and Ilmarinen, (6 April 1840 Helsinki, Grand Duchy of Finland - February 22, 1907 Naples, or Rome?, Italy) was a Finnish soldier, politician and adventurer, a lifetime appeared in several continents, and fought a number of countries, armies ranks. Becker's parents were under captain Gabriel Julian Wilhelm Becker and Kristina Fredrika Reuterskiöld.

Military career in Finland
Evert Gustav Waldemar Becker began his military career as a young student in Finland Cadet School which he completed in 1858. Becker was appointed Second Lieutenant in the Finnish Guard. After a short time in St. Petersburg he went to Africa and fought there for the Spanish troops in Morocco. After returning to St. Petersburg, he was recruited in the Grodno Hussar regiment and then to study in the General Staff Academy. For personal reasons he ran away in 1862 and went to Mexico. Outbound departure was due to the fact that Lieutenant Becker eloped with a wife of a Russian officer first to Sweden and Finland then to New York City, and therefore he was declared a deserter.

Military career in Mexico 
In Mexico, he attended the ongoing civil war in the forces of Mexico's second emperor Maximilian (emperor 1864-1867), backed by France and Spain, against the republican army led by Mexico's legitimate president Benito Juárez. He was captured by General Vicente Riva Palacio in the early stages of the war, but he was freed in an exchange of war prisoners. In the end of the war, he was again taken prisoner and was sentenced to death but pardoned. After about five years after arrival in Mexico he returned to Europe.

Return to Europe 
Mexico, while Becker was married and had Catholic religion. After returning to Europe he settled in Paris, where conservative circles reinforced his catholic sentiments and Becker went to Rome. In Rome Becker joined the Papal Swiss Guard, which, however, he resigned already after half a year to go to fight on behalf of the Greeks against the Turks. In the Greek army Becker operated as the Greek government's advisor. The Greek Government did not accept Becker's plans, so he returned to Paris and began supporting the conservative faction in Spain and Don Carlos with newspaper articles.

Back to the military 
In 1871 Becker went to fight against Turkey in the Egyptian Army. Success, however, was not special. Becker moved to serve, with the recommendation of the ambassador of Russia in Constantinople, Count Ignatiev, in Serbia's army headquarters, where he began to reform in Serbia army. At the same time, Becker exerted pressure on the Serbian government to declare the war against Turkey. Becker was appointed as the Chief of Staff of the Serbian Army Headquarters, but was forced to resign, however, after argument with the Serbian king. Since then, even the Russian army did not want to employ him. Becker went to Greece, which currently planned to form a Balkan League and attack against Turkey. The plans, however, fell after Russia initiated peace talks.

Back to Paris 
After the cancellation of the Balkan League and the attack against Turkey Becker returned to Paris, where his friends got him a position as a political journalist in L'Estafette magazine. At the same time, Becker wrote to a number of other newspapers and magazines and books. The writings attracted attention and debate, but the special attention and outcry was raised by his 1880 article "La Finlande indépendante et neutre." In his writing Becker predicted fairly accurately the future [[Russification of Finland|Russian oppression]] in Finland, and at the same time called the Finns to arms in order to obtain complete freedom and acquire guarantees of neutrality from the Great powers. During the difficult years following the article, Becker sought a living journalist, and France in the Spain, and wrote, especially the Balkan issues.

Years of Russification in Finland 
During the Russian Oppression Becker wrote of the Finnish question behind the pseudonym Ilmarinen. Becker was a very skilful and versatile high-policy expert. He was an intelligent, multilingual, and a wonderful club man but without perseverance and adaptability needed. Rest of their lives Becker lived in Naples in making the Finnish case known.

Becker was married in 1866 to a Mexican, Maria Conception Adorno, and since 1889 to a widow of a Greek banker, Anna Komnenos. After the death of Becker's widow in 1929 their ashes were brought to Finland for burial in 1931.

 Books 
 Ilmarinen, La Russie, son passé, son présant / par Ilmarinen. Neapel: [s.n.], 1906.
 Waldemar Becker, L'Albanie et les Albanais / par le Colonel [W.] Becker. Paris: Dentu, 1880.
 Waldemar Becker, Poezdka vostzejskìa gubernìi / V. Bekkeri. Moskva: [s.n.], 1852 (tipografía V. Göte)

 Sources 
 Becker, Erik: Becker-Bei – suomalainen sotilas ja poliitikko. Karisto, Hämeenlinna, 1968
 Duarte Soto, Crispin; Coronel Nicolás Romero'', episodios heroicos 1998.

Finnish military personnel
1840 births
1907 deaths
Expatriates from the Russian Empire in Mexico
Expatriates from the Russian Empire in Italy